Emsger or South Bishop is an islet situated west of Ramsey Island, Pembrokeshire, Wales. It is the largest of the Bishops and Clerks group of islets and rocks.

Etymology 
Its name can also be shown as Em-sger, Emskir or Emskyr. The second element is from Old Norse sker – a skerry, an isolated rock in the sea.

Lighthouse 
The South Bishop Lighthouse, designed by James Walker, was built on the island and started operating in 1839.

It reaches a height of 37 metres (121 feet), North Bishop reaching 44 metres (144 feet).

References

External links 

Islands of Pembrokeshire